Marinobacterium marisflavi  is a Gram-negative, strictly aerobic, chemoheterotrophic, slightly halophilic and motile bacterium from the genus of Marinobacterium which has been isolated from seawater from the Yellow Sea near Incheon Port.

References

 

Alteromonadales
Bacteria described in 2014